Mozaffar Hossain is a Jatiya Party (Ershad) politician and the former Member of Parliament of Rajshahi-5.

Career
Hossain was elected to parliament from Dhaka-11 as a Bangladesh Awami League candidate in 1973. He was elected to parliament from Rajshahi-5 as a Jatiya Party candidate in 1986 and 1988. He founded Shibganj Govt. M.H. College in Bogra District. He served the Minister of Agriculture and Forest.

Death
Hossain died on 10 June 2018 in BIRDEM, Dhaka, Bangladesh.

References

Jatiya Party politicians
2018 deaths
3rd Jatiya Sangsad members
1st Jatiya Sangsad members